Shakir Ali may refer to:
 Shakir Ali (barrister) (1879–1962), Indian lawyer and politician
 Shakir Ali (artist) (1914–1975), Pakistani artist and teacher
 Shakir Ali Museum, Lahore